Adam Burbank Lazzara (born September 22, 1981) is an American singer, songwriter, and musician. He is the lead vocalist of the rock band Taking Back Sunday. Along with singing lead vocals, Lazzara plays guitar and occasionally the harmonica.

Biography

While recording their first six track EP, Jesse Lacey left the band to form Brand New with Brian Lane, the drummer of The Rookie Lot. Then, John Nolan half-jokingly asked his friend, Adam Lazzara from High Point, North Carolina if he would move to Long Island and play bass for the band. Within the next week, Adam had moved to Bellmore with John, and was the full-time bassist. Adam worked at guitarist Eddie Reyes' father's deli for pay. After vocalist Antonio Longo left the group, Reyes convinced Lazzara to switch to vocals. Since, Lazzara has recorded seven albums with Taking Back Sunday.

Personal life

In early 2006, Lazzara met Chauntelle Dupree, guitarist of Eisley, while on tour. They started dating and became engaged on February 14, 2007. They were to be married in March 2008, but it was announced by Dupree's father in January 2008 that the wedding had been called off and that she and Lazzara had split. One month after breaking things off with DuPree, Lazzara began dating Misha Vaagen, a local bartender who had been a family friend of the DuPrees. They were married by June 2008. and had their first child, named Keaton Ari Danger, in January 2009.

In February 2015, Lazzara was arrested for a DWI while in Charlotte, North Carolina. He was released on a $2,500 bond.

Discography
With Taking Back Sunday
Tell All Your Friends (2002)
Where You Want To Be (2004)
Louder Now (2006)
New Again (2009)
Taking Back Sunday (2011)
Happiness Is (2014)
Tidal Wave (2016)

Solo
"Because It Works" (2013)

References

1981 births
Living people
American people of Italian descent
People from Sheffield, Alabama
People from High Point, North Carolina
People from Long Island
American rock singers
Singers from Alabama
21st-century American singers
21st-century American male singers